Karmelyuk, also Karmyuk, False Uniforms and From the Life of Karmalyuk) is a 1931 Ukrainian Soviet feature silent historical drama film directed by Faust Lopatinsky, shot at the Ukrainfilm studio. The plot of the film is based on the play "Robbiynyk Karmelyuk" (1926) and the 1865 short story by Marko Vovchok and was adapted for the screen by Stanislav Weiting-Radzinsky. The film stars Stepan Shagaida, Aleksandr Podorozhnyy, and Zinayida Pihulovych. The score to the film was composed by Borys Lyatoshynsky.

Karmelyuk was released in the Ukrainian SSR on September 6, 1931. In 1935, a sound version with music was created through the efforts of sound engineer Y. Murin.

Plot
In the 1830s, Young Count Piglovsky returns to his estate from Paris. The carriage in which he is riding is surrounded by rebellious peasants. Their attempt to hang the master is canceled almost at the last moment, because it is not the count in the carriage, but his lackey - Ustym Karmelyuk. Ustym really serves as a lackey in the count's house and at the same time leads a peasant uprising. The government sends the army. In a fierce fight, Karmelyuk is almost captured, but he is saved by one of the serfs.

The final credits of the film inform the viewer that after the events depicted in the film, Karmelyuk continued to fight with the lords for a long time..

Cast
Stepan Shagaida - Karmelyuk
Aleksandr Podorozhny - young gentleman, Count Piglovsky
Zinayida Pihulovych - Kylina's girlfriend, Karmelyuk's wife
Valentina Rovinska - Miss Rosalia
Ivan Tverdokhlib - a young man
A. Nikitin - father of Count Piglovsky
A. Belov - fat landowner
Hanna Shubna - peasant girl
Lavrentiy Masokha - boy
Georgy Astafyev - Medved
Kostyantyn Lundyshev, Yevhen Vikul, Hryhoriy Efremov — gentlemen

Reception
Due to the theme of the film, it was seen as a call to arms for the public and was subsequently banned.

References

External links
 
Karmelyuk on YouTube

1931 films
Ukrainian historical films
1930s historical films
Soviet silent feature films
Soviet historical drama films